Lagotis may refer to:
 Lagotis (plant), a genus of plants in the family Plantaginaceae
 Lagotis, a genus of rodents in the family Chinchillidae, synonym of Lagidium
 Lagotis, a genus of plants in the family Rubiaceae, synonym of Carpacoce
 Macrotis lagotis, a bilby